Md Zakir Hossain is a Bangladesh Awami League politician and the incumbent State Minister of Primary and Mass Education and Jatiya Sangsad member representing the Kurigram-4 constituency.

Career
Hossain was elected to the parliament on 30 December 2018 from Kurigram-4 as a Bangladesh Awami League candidate. He was appointed the State Minister of Primary and Mass Education in the Fourth Sheikh Hasina Cabinet.

References

Living people
Awami League politicians
11th Jatiya Sangsad members
State Ministers of Primary and Mass Education (Bangladesh)
Place of birth missing (living people)
1966 births